Sheikh (Rabbi) Rishama Sattar Jabbar Hilo al-Zahrony (also known as His Holiness Ganzevra Sattar Jabbar Hilo al-Zahrony) is the patriarch and international head of the Mandaean religion in Iraq. He is currently based in Baghdad, Iraq.

Biography
Rishama Sattar Jabbar Hilo was born in Iraq.

Rishama Sattar Jabbar Hilo has spoken at many conferences and seminars abroad to raise awareness of the human rights crisis among the Mandaeans of Iraq and Iran.

See also
Dakhil Aidan, the Mandaean patriarch from 1917 to 1964 in Iraq
Jabbar Choheili, a former Mandaean patriarch of Ahvaz, Iran
Yahya Bihram, a 19-century Mandaean priest (from Iraq)
Mandaeans in Iraq, in the Arabic Wikipedia

References

External links
 Mandaean Network
 Facebook
 Instagram

Living people
Mandaean priests
Iraqi Mandaeans
Iraqi religious leaders
Year of birth missing (living people)
20th-century births